The Turkistan Islamic Party in Syria (TIP;) is the Syrian branch of the Turkistan Islamic Party, an armed Uyghur Salafist jihadist group with a presence in the Syrian Civil War. While the TIP has been active in Syria, the organization's core leadership is based in Afghanistan and Pakistan, with a presence in its home territory of China.

History 
TIP (ETIM) sent the "Turkistan Brigade" (Katibat Turkistani), also known as the Turkistan Islamic Party in Syria to take part in the Syrian Civil War, most noticeably in the 2015 Jisr al-Shughur offensive. Al-Qaeda linked groups in Syria include the Syrian branch of the Chechen Caucasus Emirate, Uzbek militants, and the Turkistan Islamic Party.

TIP has participated in:

 Northwestern Syria offensive (April–June 2015)
 Al-Ghab offensive (July–August 2015)
 Siege of Abu al-Duhur Airbase
 Russian military intervention in the Syrian Civil War
 Northwestern Syria offensive (October–November 2015)
 Latakia offensive (2015–2016)
 Aleppo offensive (October 2015 – present)
 Siege of Al-Fu'ah-Kafarya (2015)
 Aleppo offensive (April 2016)
 Aleppo offensive (May 2016)

Syrian Churches have been demolished by Turkistan Islamic Party Uyghur fighters, who exalted in the acts of destruction, and in Homs and Idlib battlefields the Turkistan Islamic Party cooperated with Uzbek brigades and Jabhat al-Nusra, Jabhat al-Nusra and IS (ISIL) compete with each other to recruit Uyghur fighters. In Jisr al-Shughur a Church's cross had a TIP flag placed on top of it after the end of the battle. The Uzbek group Katibat al-Tawhid wal Jihad (Tavhid va Jihod katibasi) released a video featuring themselves and the Uyghur Turkistan Islamic Party attacking and desecrating Christian Churches in Jisr al-Shughur. Jabhat al Nusra and Turkistan Islamic Party fighters were accused of displacing Christian residents of rural Jisr al-Shughour, and reportedly killed a Syrian Christian man along with his wife, accusing them of being Syrian government agents. The Saudi news agency Al-Arabiya said that the area was Alawite.

Turkistan Islamic Party has exploited the Turkish Postal Service and Turkish banks to solicit donations via the organization "Türkistan İslam Derneği" through the website "Doğu Türkistan Bülteni".

Child soldiers 
Camps training children for Jihad are being run by the Turkistan Islamic Party in Syria. Uyghur child soldiers being instructed in Sharia and training with guns were depicted in a video released by TIP.

Route into Syria 
According to the Jamestown Foundation, Turkish connections were used by Uyghur fighters to go into Syria and the humanitarian Uyghur East Turkistan Education and Solidarity Association (ETESA) which is located in Turkey sent Uyghurs into Syria, endorsed the killing of the pro-China Imam Juma Tayir, applauded attacks in China, and posted on its website content from the TIP.

Its top commander Abu Omar al-Turkistani who also served as the group's first overall leader was killed in an American drone strike in Sarmada, Idlib on 1 January 2017. His replacement leader Abu Rida al-Turkistani was then killed in a series of Russian airstrikes on his home near the town of Ariha on 12 January 2017 leaving his entire family dead as well. Ibrahim Mansour succeeded Abu Rida al-Turkistani as the third leader of TIP since then.

See also 
 Jihadism
 Terrorism in China
 Xinjiang raid
 Turkistan Islamic Party

References

External links
Ḥizb al-Islāmī al-Turkistānī in Bilād al-Shām
Turkistan Islamic Party | FDD's Long War Journal
news.siteintelgroup.com 

2012 establishments in Syria
Qutbist organisations
Anti-government factions of the Syrian civil war
East Turkestan independence movement
Groups affiliated with al-Qaeda
Jihadist groups in Syria
Pan-Turkist organizations
Sunni Islamist groups
Turkistan Islamic Party
Salafi Jihadist groups
Turkish supported militant groups of the Syrian civil war